The High Court of Jammu & Kashmir and Ladakh is the common high court for union territories of Jammu and Kashmir and Ladakh. It was established as the High Court of Jammu and Kashmir on 26 March 1928 by the Maharaja of Jammu and Kashmir. The seat of the court shifts between the summer capital Srinagar and winter capital Jammu. The court has a sanctioned judge strength of 17, 13 of whom are permanent judges, and 4 are additional judges. Since 13 February, 2023, the chief justice of the court is Hon'ble Shri Justice N. Kotiswar Singh.

History
The High Court of Jammu and Kashmir was established by Order No. 1, issued by Maharaja Hari Singh on 26 March 1928. The Maharaja appointed Lala Kanwar Sain as the first chief justice, and Lala Bodh Raj Sawhney and Khan Sahib Aga Syed Hussain as puisne judges. The High Court sat at both the winter capital of Jammu, and the summer capital of Srinagar. The Maharaja conferred letters patent on the High Court on 10 September 1943. 

Puisne judge Khan Sahib Aga Syed Hussain was the first Muslim judge of the High Court. He retired as Home and Judicial Minister of Jammu and Kashmir during the Maharaja Rule.

In August 2018, the High Court got its first and second woman judges with Justice Sindhu Sharma, who was appointed a judge, and Justice Gita Mittal, who was appointed the chief justice.

In August 2019, a Reorganisation Bill was passed by both houses of the Indian Parliament. This bill reorganised the state of Jammu and Kashmir into two union territories—Jammu and Kashmir and Ladakh—as of 31 October 2019. After this reorganisation, the High Court of Jammu and Kashmir continued serving as the High Court of Jammu and Kashmir and Ladakh for both union territories.

Hon'ble Shri Justice Tashi Rabstan was appointed as the Acting Chief Justice of the High Court on 8 December 2022.

List of former chief justices

Notable people
 

Hakim Imtiyaz Hussain (born 1949), former Jammu and Kashmir High Court judge

Jammu and Kashmir State Judicial Academy 

In 2001, the High Court  established its regular Judicial Academy via order No. 342, dated 26 July. Since then, Jammu and Kashmir State Judicial Academy functions regularly and holds training programmes. Jammu and Kashmir State Judicial Academy has its own infrastructure in Jammu (in the premises of the High Court) and in Srinagar (Mominabad). 

The administrative machinery of High Court of Jammu and Kashmir and Ladakh moves to Srinagar, its summer capital, in April and Jammu, its winter capital, in November every year. In view of this tradition, Jammu and Kashmir State Judicial Academy also functions likewise from Jammu and Srinagar. It has infrastructures both in Jammu and Srinagar.

References

Further reading
 Jurisdiction and Seats of Indian High Courts
  Judge strength in High Courts increased

External links
 Jammu and Kashmir and Ladakh High Court official website

Government of Jammu and Kashmir
1928 establishments in India
Judiciary of India
High Courts of India
Courts and tribunals established in 1928